Paul Marc Maslansky (born November 23, 1933) is an American film producer and writer best known for the Police Academy movies.

Early life 
Maslansky was born in Rego Park, New York on November 23, 1933. He played jazz for a living while briefly attending law school in New York. He graduated from Washington & Lee University in Lexington, Virginia in 1954.

Career 
Maslansky has 41 film credits as producer or executive producer. His first production credit was for 1964's Castle of the Living Dead, which starred Christopher Lee. Initially, Maslansky used his middle initial in his credits, though this was later dropped. Maslansky worked throughout the 1960s and 1970s as producer, notable credits include Race with the Devil, Damnation Alley, The Villain, and Love Child.

Maslansky was nominated for a Primetime Emmy Award for the 1978 series King.

Maslansky had a breakthrough hit with Police Academy in 1984. From a budget of $4.1 million, the film grossed $155 million and spawned a film franchise and television series Police Academy: The Series, which Maslansky wrote.

He frequently made cameo appearances in the Police Academy movies.

Maslansky's notable credits following Police Academy include 1985's Return to Oz, 1990's The Russia House and Fluke in 1995.

Maslansky has the Lenfest Center for the Art's 'Maslansky Rehearsal Hall' in Lexington named after him.

Filmography 
He was a producer in all films unless otherwise noted.

Film 

 As writer

 As an actor

 Production manager

 As director

 Second unit director or assistant director

 Miscellaneous crew

Television 

 As writer

 As an actor

References

External links 
 

1933 births
Living people
20th-century American businesspeople
21st-century American businesspeople
20th-century American screenwriters
American television writers
Film producers from New York (state)
Screenwriters from  New York (state)
Washington and Lee University alumni
Writers from Queens, New York